Municipal elections were held in Finland on 22 October 2000.

National results

References

Municipal elections in Finland
Municipal
Finland